Sebbe is a 2010 Swedish film written and directed by Babak Najafi. The film won the Guldbagge Award for Best Film at the 46th Guldbagge Awards.

Plot 
Sebbe is 15 years old and lives with his mother in an apartment that is too narrow. Sebbe always does his best and never strikes back. But when the mother fails, everything fails.

Cast 
 Sebastian Hiort af Ornäs as Sebbe
 Eva Melander as Eva, Sebbe's mother
 Kenny Wåhlbrink as Kenny
 Emil Kadeby as Emil
 Adrian Ringman as Adde
 Leo Salomon Ringart as Leo
 Åsa Bodin Karlsson as Kenny's mother
 Margret Andersson as The teacher
 Miran Kamala as Eva's boss

External links 
 
 
 

Swedish drama films
Best Film Guldbagge Award winners
Films directed by Babak Najafi
2010 directorial debut films
2010 films
2010 drama films
2010s Swedish films